Emilie Charlotte, Lady de Bathe (née Le Breton, formerly Langtry; 13 October 1853 – 12 February 1929), known as Lillie (or Lily) Langtry and nicknamed "The Jersey Lily", was a British socialite, stage actress and producer.

Born on the island of Jersey, upon marrying she moved to London in 1876. Her looks and personality attracted interest, commentary, and invitations from artists and society hostesses, and she was celebrated as a young woman of great beauty and charm. During the aesthetic movement in England she had been painted by aesthete artists, and in 1882 she became the poster-girl for Pears Soap, becoming the first celebrity to endorse a commercial product.

In 1881, Langtry became an actress and made her West End debut in the comedy She Stoops to Conquer, causing a sensation in London by becoming the first socialite to appear on stage. She would go on to star in many plays in both the United Kingdom and the United States, including The Lady of Lyons, and Shakespeare's As You Like It, eventually running her own stage production company. In later life she performed "dramatic sketches" in vaudeville. From the mid-1890s until 1919 Langtry lived at Regal Lodge at Newmarket in Suffolk where she maintained a successful horse racing stable. She was also known for her relationships with royal figures and noblemen, including the Prince of Wales (future Edward VII), the Earl of Shrewsbury, and Prince Louis of Battenberg. She was the subject of widespread public and media interest.

Biography

Born in 1853 and known as Lillie from childhood, she was the daughter of the Very Reverend William Corbet Le Breton and his wife, a recognised beauty, Emilie Davis (née Martin). Lillie's parents had eloped to Gretna Green in Scotland, and, in 1842, married at St Luke's Church, Chelsea, London. The couple lived in Southwark, London before William was offered the post of Rector and Dean of Jersey. Emilie Charlotte (Lillie) was subsequently born at the Old Rectory, St Saviour, on Jersey. She was baptised in St Saviour on 9 November 1853.

Lillie was the sixth of seven children and the only girl. Her brothers were Francis Corbet Le Breton (1843–1872), William Inglis Le Breton (1846–1924), Trevor Alexander Le Breton (1847–1870), Maurice Vavasour Le Breton (1849–1881), Clement Martin Le Breton (10 January 1851 – 1 July 1927), and Reginald Le Breton (1855–1876). Purportedly, one of their ancestors was Richard le Breton, allegedly one of the assassins in 1170 of Thomas Becket.

Lillie's French governess was reputed to have been unable to manage her, so Lillie was educated by her brothers' tutor. This education was of a wider and more solid nature than that typically given to girls at that time. Although their father held the respectable position of Dean of Jersey, he nevertheless earned an unsavoury reputation as a philanderer, fathering illegitimate children by various of his parishioners. When his wife Emilie finally left him in 1880, he left Jersey.

From Jersey to London

On 9 March 1874, 20-year-old Lillie married 26-year-old Irish landowner Edward Langtry, a widower, who had previously been married to Jane Frances Price. She had been the sister of Elizabeth Ann Price, who had married Lillie's brother William. Lillie and Edward held their wedding reception at The Royal Yacht Hotel in St. Helier, Jersey. Langtry was wealthy enough to own a large sailing yacht called Red Gauntlet, and Lillie insisted that he take her away from the Channel Islands. In 1876 they rented an apartment in Eaton Place, Belgravia, London, and early in 1878 they moved to 17 Norfolk Street off Park Lane to accommodate the growing demands of Lillie's society visitors.

In an interview published in several newspapers (including the Brisbane Herald) in 1882, Lillie Langtry said:
It was through Lord Raneleigh  and the painter Frank Miles that I was first introduced to London society ... I went to London and was brought out by my friends. Among the most enthusiastic of these was Mr Frank Miles, the artist. I learned afterwards that he saw me one evening at the theatre, and tried in vain to discover who I was. He went to his clubs and among his artist friends declaring he had seen a beauty, and he described me to everybody he knew, until one day one of his friends met me and he was duly introduced. Then Mr Miles came and begged me to sit for my portrait. I consented, and when the portrait was finished he sold it to Prince Leopold. From that time I was invited everywhere and made a great deal of by many members of the royal family and nobility. After Frank Miles I sat for portraits to Millais and Burne-Jones and now Frith is putting my face in one of his great pictures.

In 1877 Lillie's brother Clement Le Breton had married Alice, an illegitimate daughter of Thomas Heron Jones, 7th Viscount Ranelagh, who was a friend of their father; and Ranelagh, following a chance meeting with Lillie in London had invited her to a reception attended by several noted artists at the home of Sir John and Lady Sebright at 23 Lowndes Square, Knightsbridge, which took place on 29 April 1877. Here she attracted notice for her beauty and wit. Langtry was in mourning for her youngest brother, who had been killed in a riding accident, so in contrast to the elaborate clothes of most women in attendance there, she wore a simple black dress (which was to become her trademark) and no jewellery. Before the end of the evening, Frank Miles had completed several sketches of her that became very popular on postcards. Another guest, Sir John Everett Millais, also a Jersey native, eventually painted her portrait. Langtry's nickname, the "Jersey Lily", was taken from the Jersey lily flower (Amaryllis belladonna), a symbol of Jersey. The nickname was popularised by Millais' portrait, entitled A Jersey Lily. (According to tradition, the two Jersey natives spoke Jèrriais to each other during the sittings.) The painting caused great interest when exhibited at the Royal Academy and had to be roped off to avoid damage by the crowds. Langtry was portrayed holding a Guernsey lily (Nerine sarniensis) in the painting rather than a Jersey lily, as none of the latter was available during the sittings. A friend of Millais, Rupert Potter (father of Beatrix Potter), was a keen amateur photographer and took pictures of Lillie whilst she was visiting Millais in Scotland in 1879. She also sat for Sir Edward Poynter and is depicted in works by Sir Edward Burne-Jones. She became much sought-after in London society, and invitations flooded in. Her fame soon reached royal ears.

Royal mistress

The Prince of Wales, Albert Edward ("Bertie", later Edward VII), arranged to sit next to Langtry at a dinner party given by Sir Allen Young on 24 May 1877. (Lillie's husband Edward was seated at the other end of the table.) Although the Prince was married to Princess Alexandra of Denmark and had six children, he was a well-known philanderer. He became infatuated with Langtry, and she soon became his mistress. She was presented to the Prince's mother, Queen Victoria. Princess Alexandra chose to never display any jealousy about her husband's infidelities and accepted and acknowledged Lillie.

Lillie's liaison with the Prince lasted from late 1877 to June 1880. Although remaining friends with the Prince, Lillie Langtry's physical relationship with him ended when she became pregnant. The father was probably her old friend Arthur Jones, who accompanied her to Paris for the birth of the child, Jeanne Marie, in March 1881.

In July 1879, Langtry began an affair with the Earl of Shrewsbury; in January 1880, Langtry and the earl were planning to run away together. In the autumn of 1879, scandal-mongering journalist Adolphus Rosenberg wrote in Town Talk of rumours that her husband would divorce her and cite, among others, the Prince of Wales as co-respondent. Rosenberg also wrote about Patsy Cornwallis-West, whose husband sued him for libel. At this point, the Prince of Wales instructed his solicitor George Lewis to sue also. Rosenberg pleaded guilty to both charges and was sentenced to two years in prison.

For some time, the Prince saw little of Langtry. He remained fond of her and spoke well of her in her later career as a theatre actress; he used his influence to help and encourage her. With the withdrawal of royal favour, creditors closed in. The Langtrys' finances were not equal to their lifestyle. In October 1880, Langtry sold many of her possessions to meet her debts, allowing Edward Langtry to avoid a declaration of bankruptcy.

Daughter

In April 1879, Langtry had had a short affair with Prince Louis of Battenberg, but also had a longer relationship with Arthur Clarence Jones (1854–1930), the brother of her sister-in-law and another illegitimate child of Lord Ranelagh. In June 1880, she became pregnant. Her husband was not the father; she led Prince Louis to believe that he was. When the prince told his parents, they had him assigned to the warship . The Prince of Wales gave her a sum of money, and Langtry went into her confinement in Paris, accompanied by Arthur Jones. On 8 March 1881, she gave birth to a daughter, whom she named Jeanne Marie.

The discovery in 1978 of Langtry's passionate letters to Arthur Jones and their publication by Laura Beatty in 1999 support the idea that Jones was the father of Langtry's daughter. Prince Louis' son, Earl Mountbatten of Burma, however, had always maintained that his father was the father of Jeanne Marie.

In 1902, Jeanne Marie married the Scottish politician Sir Ian Malcolm at St Margaret's, Westminster. They had four children, three sons and a daughter. Jeanne Marie died in 1964. Her daughter Mary Malcolm was one of the first two female announcers on the BBC Television Service (now BBC One) from 1948 to 1956. She died on 13 October 2010, aged 92. Jeanne Marie's second son, Victor Neill Malcolm, married English actress Ann Todd. They divorced in the late 1930s. Victor Malcolm remarried in 1942, to an American, Mary Ellery Channing.

Acting career and manager

In 1881, Langtry was in need of money. Her close friend Oscar Wilde suggested she try the stage, and Langtry embarked upon a theatrical career. She first auditioned for an amateur production in the Twickenham Town Hall on 19 November 1881. It was a comedy two-hander called A Fair Encounter, with Henrietta Labouchère taking the other role and coaching Langtry in her acting. Labouchère had been a professional actress before she met and married Liberal MP Henry Labouchère. Following favourable reviews of this first attempt at the stage, and with further coaching, Langtry made her debut before the London public, playing Kate Hardcastle in She Stoops to Conquer at the West End's Haymarket Theatre in December 1881. Critical opinion was mixed, but she was a success with the public. She next performed in Ours at the same theatre. Although her affair with the Prince of Wales was over, he supported her new venture by attending several of her performances and helping attract an audience.

Early in 1882, Langtry quit the production at the Haymarket and started her own company, touring the UK with various plays. She was still under the tutelage of Henrietta Labouchère. American impresario Henry Abbey arranged a tour in the United States for Langtry. She arrived in October 1882 to be met by the press and Oscar Wilde, who was in New York on a lecture tour. Her first appearance was eagerly anticipated, but the theatre burnt down the night before the opening; the show moved to another venue and opened the following week. Eventually, her production company started a coast-to-coast tour of the US, ending in May 1883 with a "fat profit." Before leaving New York, she had an acrimonious break with Henrietta Labouchère over Langtry's relationship with Frederick Gebhard, a wealthy young American. Her first tour of the US (accompanied by Gebhard) was an enormous success, which she repeated in subsequent years. While the critics generally condemned her interpretations of roles such as Pauline in The Lady of Lyons or Rosalind in As You Like It, the public loved her. After her return from New York in 1883, Langtry registered at the Conservatoire in Paris for six weeks' intensive training to improve her acting technique. On 8 November 1883, she and her team performed in Ottawa in the play "School of Scandal".

In 1889, she took on the part of Lady Macbeth in Shakespeare's Macbeth. In 1903, she starred in the US in The Crossways, written by her in collaboration with J. Hartley Manners, husband of actress Laurette Taylor. She returned to the US for tours in 1906 and again in 1912, appearing in vaudeville. She last appeared on stage in America in 1917. Later that year, she made her final appearance in the theatre in London.

From 1900 to 1903, with financial support from Edgar Israel Cohen, Langtry became the lessee and manager of London's Imperial Theatre, opening on 21 April 1901, following an extensive refurbishment. On the site of the theatre is now the Westminster Central Hall. In a film released in 1913 directed by Edwin S. Porter, Langtry starred opposite Sidney Mason in the role of Mrs Norton in His Neighbor's Wife in what would be her only film appearance.

Thoroughbred racing
For nearly a decade, from 1882 to 1891, Langtry had a relationship with an American, Frederick Gebhard, described as a young clubman, sportsman, horse owner, and admirer of feminine beauty, both on and off the stage. Gebhard's wealth was inherited; his maternal grandfather Thomas E. Davis was one of the wealthiest New York real estate owners of the period. His paternal grandfather, Dutchman Frederick Gebhard, came to New York in 1800 and developed a mercantile business that expanded into banking and railroad stocks. Gebhard's father died when he was 5 years old and his mother died when he was about 10. He and his sister, Isabelle, were raised by a guardian, paternal uncle William H Gebhard.

With Gebhard, Langtry became involved in horse racing. In 1885, she and Gebhard brought a stable of American horses to race in England. On 13 August 1888, Langtry and Gebhard travelled in her private carriage attached to an Erie Railroad express train bound for Chicago. Another railcar was transporting 17 of their horses when it derailed at Shohola, Pennsylvania, at 1:40 am. Rolling down an  embankment, it burst into flames. One person died in the fire, along with Gebhard's champion runner Eole and 14 racehorses belonging to him and Langtry. Two horses survived the wreck, including St. Saviour, full brother to Eole. He was named for St. Saviour's Church in Jersey. This was where Langtry's father had been rector and where she chose to be buried at her death. Despite speculation, Langtry and Gebhard never married. In 1895, he married Lulu Morris of Baltimore; they divorced in 1901. In 1905 he married Marie Wilson; he died in 1910.

In 1889, Langtry met "an eccentric young bachelor, with vast estates in Scotland, a large breeding stud, a racing stable, and more money than he knew what to do with": this was George Alexander Baird or Squire Abington, as he came to be known. He inherited wealth from his grandfather, who with seven of his sons, had developed and prospered from coal and iron workings. Baird's father had died when he was a young boy, leaving him a fortune in trust. In addition, he inherited the estates of two wealthy uncles who had died childless.

Langtry and Baird met at a race course when he gave her a betting tip and the stake money to place on the horse. The horse won and, at a later luncheon party, Baird also offered her the gift of a horse named Milford. She at first demurred, but others at the table advised her to accept, as this horse was a very fine prospect. The horse won several races under Langtry's colours; he was registered to "Mr Jersey" (women were excluded from registering horses at this time). Langtry became involved in a relationship with Baird, from 1891 until his death in March 1893.

When Baird died, Langtry purchased two of his horses, Lady Rosebery and Studley Royal, at the estate dispersal sale. She moved her training to Sam Pickering's stables at Kentford House and took Regal Lodge as a residence in the village of Kentford, near Newmarket, Suffolk. The building is a short distance from Baird's original race horse breeding establishment, which has since been renamed Meddler Stud.

Langtry found mentors in Captain James Octavius Machell and Joe Thompson, who provided guidance on all matters related to the turf. When her trainer Pickering failed to deliver results, she moved her expanded string of 20 horses to Fred Webb at Exning.  In 1899 James Machell sold his Newmarket stables to Colonel Harry Leslie Blundell McCalmont, a wealthy racehorse owner, who was Langtry's brother-in-law, having married Hugo de Bathe's sister Winifred in 1897. He was also related to Langtry's first husband, Edward, whose ship-owning grandfather, George, had married into the County Antrim Callwell family, being related in marriage to the McCalmonts.

Told of a good horse for sale in Australia called Merman, she purchased it and had it shipped to England; such shipments were risky and she had a previous bad experience with a horse arriving injured (Maluma). Merman was regarded as one of the best stayers; he eventually went on to win the Lewes Handicap, the Cesarewitch, Jockey Club Cup, Goodwood Stakes, Goodwood Cup, and Ascot Gold Cup (with Tod Sloan up). Langtry later had a second Cesarewitch winner with Yentoi, and a third place with Raytoi. An imported horse from New Zealand called Uniform, won the Lewes Handicap for her.

Other trainers used by Langtry were Jack Robinson, who trained at Foxhill in Wiltshire, and a very young Fred Darling whose first big success was Yentoi's 1908 Cesarewitch.

Langtry owned a stud at Gazely, Newmarket. This venture was not a success. After a few years, she gave up attempts to breed blood-stock. Langtry sold Regal Lodge and all her horse-racing interests in 1919 before she moved to Monaco. Regal Lodge had been her home for twenty-three years and received many celebrated guests, not least of whom was the Prince of Wales.

William Ewart Gladstone
During her stage career, she became friendly with William Ewart Gladstone (1809–1898), who was the British Prime Minister on four occasions during the reign of Queen Victoria. In her memoirs Langtry says that she first met Gladstone when she was posing for her portrait at Millais' studio. They were later friends and he became a mentor to her.  He told her, "In your professional career, you will receive attacks, personal and critical, just and unjust. Bear them, never reply, and, above all, never rush into print to explain or defend yourself."

In 1925, Captain Peter Emmanuel Wright published a book called Portraits and Criticisms. In it, he claimed that Gladstone had numerous extramarital affairs, including one with Langtry. Gladstone's son Herbert Gladstone wrote a letter calling Wright a liar, a coward and a fool; Wright sued him. During the trial a telegram, sent by Langtry from Monte Carlo, was read out in court saying, "I strongly repudiate the slanderous accusations of Peter Wright." The jury found against Wright, saying that the "gist of the defendant's letter of 27 July was true" and that the evidence vindicated the high moral standards of the late Gladstone.

American citizenship and divorce

In 1888, Langtry became a property owner in the United States when she and Frederick Gebhard purchased adjoining ranches in Lake County, California. She sold it in 1906. Bearing the Langtry Farms name, the winery and vineyard are still in operation in Middletown, California.

During her travels in the United States, Langtry became an American citizen and on 13 May 1897, divorced her husband, Edward Langtry, in Lakeport, California. Her ownership of land in America was introduced in evidence at her divorce to help demonstrate to the judge that she was a citizen of the country. In June of that year Edward Langtry issued a statement giving his side of the story, which was published in the New York Journal.

He died a few months later in Chester Asylum, after being found by police in a demented condition at  railway station.  His death was probably due to a brain haemorrhage after a fall during a steamer crossing from Belfast to Liverpool. He was buried in Overleigh Cemetery; a verdict of accidental death was returned at the inquest. A letter of condolence later written by Langtry to another widow reads in part, "I too have lost a husband, but alas! it was no great loss."

Langtry continued to have involvement with her husband's Irish properties after his death. These were compulsorily purchased from her in 1928 under the Northern Ireland Land Act, 1925. This was passed after the Partition of Ireland, with the purpose of transferring certain lands from owners to tenants.

Hugo Gerald de Bathe
However, in 1899, she married 28-year-old Hugo Gerald de Bathe (1871–1940), son of Sir Henry de Bathe, 4th Baronet and Charlotte Clare. Hugo's parents had initially not married, due to objections from the de Bathe family. They lived together and seven of their children were born out of wedlock. They married after the death of Sir Henry's father in 1870, and Hugo was their first son born in wedlock – making him heir to the baronetcy.

The wedding between Langtry and de Bathe took place in St Saviour's Church, Jersey, on 27 July 1899, with Jeanne Marie Langtry being the only other person present, apart from the officials. This was the same day that Langtry's horse, Merman, won the Goodwood Cup. In December 1899, de Bathe volunteered to join the British forces in the Boer War. He was assigned to the Robert's Horse Mounted brigade as a lieutenant. In 1907, Hugo's father died; he became the 5th Baronet, and Langtry became Lady de Bathe.

When Hugo de Bathe became the 5th Baronet, he inherited properties in Sussex, Devon and Ireland; those in Sussex were in the hamlet of West Stoke near Chichester. These were: Woodend, with 17 bedrooms and set in 71 acres; Hollandsfield, with 10 bedrooms and set in 52 acres and Balsom's Farm of 206 acres. Woodend was retained as the de Bathe residence whilst the smaller Hollandsfield was let.

Today the buildings retain their period appearance, but modifications and additions have been made, and the complex is now multi-occupancy. One of the houses on the site is named Langtry and another Hardy. The de Bathe properties were all sold in 1919, the same year Lady de Bathe sold Regal Lodge.

Final days

During her final years, Langtry, as Lady de Bathe, resided in Monaco whilst her husband, Sir Hugo de Bathe, lived in Vence, Alpes Maritimes. The two saw one another at social gatherings or in brief private encounters. During World War I, Hugo de Bathe was an ambulance driver for the French Red Cross.

Langtry's closest companion during her time in Monaco was her friend Mathilde Marie Peat. Peat was at Langtry's side during the final days of her life as she was dying of pneumonia in Monte Carlo. Langtry left Peat £10,000, the Monaco property known as Villa le Lys, clothes, and her motor car.

Langtry died in Monaco at dawn on 12 February 1929. She had asked to be buried in her parents' tomb at St. Saviour's Church in Jersey. Due to blizzards, transport was delayed. Her body was taken to St Malo and across to Jersey on 22 February aboard the steamer Saint Brieuc. Her coffin lay in St Saviour's overnight surrounded by flowers, and she was buried on the afternoon of 23 February.

Bequests
In her will, Langtry left £2,000 to a young man of whom she had become fond in later life, named Charles Louis D'Albani; the son of a Newmarket solicitor, he was born in about 1891. She also left £1,000 to Dr A. T. Bulkeley Gavin of 5 Berkeley Square, London, a physician and surgeon who treated wealthy patients. In 1911 he had been engaged to author Katherine Cecil Thurston, who died before they could marry; she had already changed her will in favour of Bulkeley Gavin.

Cultural influence and portrayals
Langtry used her high public profile to endorse commercial products such as cosmetics and soap–an early example of celebrity endorsement. She used her famous ivory complexion to generate income, being the first woman to endorse a commercial product when she began advertising Pears Soap in 1882. The aesthetic movement in England became directly involved in advertising, and Pears (under advertising pioneer Thomas J. Barratt) recruited Langtry—who had been painted by aesthete artists—to promote their products, which included putting her "signature" on the advertisements.

In the 1944 Universal film The Scarlet Claw, Lillian Gentry, the first murder victim, wife of Lord William Penrose and former actress, is an oblique reference to Langtry.

Langtry's life story has been portrayed in film numerous times. Lilian Bond played her in The Westerner (1940), and Ava Gardner in The Life and Times of Judge Roy Bean (1972). Bean was played by Walter Brennan in the former, and by Paul Newman in the latter film.

In 1978, Langtry's story was dramatised by London Weekend Television and produced as Lillie, starring Francesca Annis in the title role (Annis received the British Academy Television Award for Best Actress). Annis previously played Langtry in two episodes of ATV's Edward the Seventh. Jenny Seagrove played her in the 1991 television film Incident at Victoria Falls.

Langtry is a featured character in the fictional The Flashman Papers novels of George MacDonald Fraser, in which she is noted as a former lover of arch-cad Harry Flashman, who, nonetheless, describes her as one of his few true loves.

Langtry is suggested as an inspiration for Irene Adler, a character in the Sherlock Holmes fiction of Sir Arthur Conan Doyle. In "A Scandal in Bohemia", Adler bests Holmes, perhaps the only woman to do so.

Langtry is used as a touchstone for old-fashioned manners in Preston Sturges's comedy The Lady Eve (1941), in a scene where a corpulent woman drops a handkerchief on the floor and the hero ignores it. Jean (Barbara Stanwyck) begins to describe, comment, and anticipate the events that we see reflected in her hand mirror: "The dropped kerchief! That hasn't been used since Lillie Langtry ... you'll have to pick it up yourself, madam ... it's a shame, but he doesn't care for the flesh, he'll never see it."

Lillie Langtry is the inspiration for The Who's 1967 hit single "Pictures of Lily", as mentioned in Pete Townshend's 2012 memoir Who I Am. Dixie Carter portrays Langtry as a "songbird" and Brady Hawkes' love interest in Kenny Rogers' 1994 Gambler V: Playing for Keeps, the last of the Gambler series for CBS that started in 1980. Langtry is depicted as a singer, not an actress, and Dixie Carter's costuming appears closer to Mae West than anything Langtry ever wore.

In The Simpsons 1994 episode, "Burns' Heir", the auditions are held in the Lillie Langtry Theater on Burns' estate.

Langtry is a featured character in the play Sherlock Holmes and the Case of the Jersey Lily by Katie Forgette. In this work, she is blackmailed over her past relationship with the Prince of Wales, with intimate letters as proof. She and Oscar Wilde employ Sherlock Holmes and Dr. Watson to investigate the matter.

Places connected with Lillie Langtry

When first married (1874), Edward and Lillie Langtry had a property called Cliffe Lodge in Southampton, Hampshire. Langtry lived at 21 Pont Street, London from 1890 to 1897, and had with her eight servants at the 1891 census. Although from 1895 the building was operated as the Cadogan Hotel, she would stay in her former bedroom there. A blue plaque (which erroneously states that she was born in 1852) on the hotel commemorates this, and the hotel's restaurant is named 'Langtry's' in her honour.

A short walk from Pont Street was a house at number 2 Cadogan Place where she lived in 1899. From 1886 to 1894, she owned a house in Manhattan at 362 West 23rd Street, a gift from Frederick Gebhard.

In 1938 the new owners of the Red House at 26 Derby Road, Bournemouth which had been built in 1877 by the widowed women's rights campaigner and temperance activist Emily Langton Langton, converted the large house into an hotel, 'Manor Heath Hotel', and advertised it as having been built for Lillie Langtry by the Prince of Wales, believing that the inscription 'E.L.L. 1877' in one of the rooms related to Lillie Langtry. A plaque placed on the hotel by Bournemouth Council confirmed the connection and in the late 1970s the hotel was renamed Langtry Manor. However, despite the hotel's claims and local legend, no actual association between Langtry and the house ever existed and the Prince never visited it 

On 2 April 1965 the Evening Standard reported an interview with the former actress Electra Yaras (died 2010, aged 88) who, in the 1950s, had bought the lease of Leighton House, 103 Alexandra Road, South Hampstead, and who now claimed that Langtry had lived in the house and been regularly visited there by the Prince of Wales. Yaras claimed that she had herself several times been visited in the house by Langtry's ghost. On 11 April 1971 The Hampstead News said that the house had been built for Langtry by Lord Leighton. These claims, made to suggest an historical importance for the house and support its preservation, were supported by the actress Adrienne Corri and publicised in The Times of 8 October 1971 and The Daily Telegraph of 9 October 1971. They were given further publicity by Anita Leslie in 1973. The house was, however, demolished in 1971 to make way for the Alexandra Road Estate. In 2021 research revealed that the house had been built in the 1860s by Samuel Litchfield and probably named after his wife's birthplace of Leighton Buzzard, and lengthy work in local records by Dick Weindling and Marianne Colloms has revealed no connection whatever with Lillie Langtry. Langtry is, however, further 'remembered' in the area in the names of Langtry Road, off Kilburn Priory; Langtry Walk in the Alexandra and Ainsworth Estate, and by the 'Lillie Langtry' public house at 121 Abbey Road (built in 1969 to replace 'The Princess of Wales' and briefly called 'The Cricketers' in 2007–11) as well as "The Lillie Langtry" on 19 Lillie Rd, in Fulham (though the Road originally took its name from a local landowner John Scott Lillie).

Langtry's London address from 1916 until at least 1920 was Cornwall Lodge, Allsop Place, Regent's Park. She gave this address when sailing on the liner St Paul across the Atlantic in August 1916, and the 1920 London electoral register has de Bathe, Emilie Charlotte (Lady), listed at the same address.  A letter sold at auction in 2014 from Langtry to Dr. Harvey dated 1918 is also headed with this address. Langtry was a cousin of local politician Philip Le Breton, pioneer for the preservation of Hampstead Heath, whose wife was Anna Letitia Aikin.

There are two bars in New York City devoted to the memory of Lillie Langtry, operating under the title Lillie's Victorian Establishment. 
Judge Roy Bean named the saloon "The Jersey Lilly", which also served as the judge's courthouse, for her, in Langtry, Texas (named after the unrelated engineer George Langtry).

Steam yacht White Ladye

Langtry owned a luxury steam auxiliary yacht called White Ladye from 1891 to 1897. The yacht was built in 1891 for Lord Asburton by Ramage & Ferguson of Leith, Scotland from a design by W. C. Storey. She had 3 masts, was 204 feet in length and 27 feet in breadth and was powered by a 142 hp steam engine. She had originally been named Ladye Mabel.

In 1893, Ogden Goelet leased the vessel from Langtry and used it until his death in 1897. Langtry put the White Ladye up for auction in November 1897 at the Mart, Tokenhouse Yard, London. It was sold to Scottish entrepreneur John Lawson Johnston, the creator of Bovril. He owned it until his death on board in 1900.

From 1902 to 1903, the yacht was recorded in the Lloyd's Yacht Register as being owned by shipbuilder William Cresswell Gray, Tunstall Manor, West Hartlepool, and remained so until 1915. Following this the Lloyd's Register records that she became adapted as French trawler La Champagne based in Fécamp; she was broken up in 1935.

Bibliography
 Langtry, Lillie, The Days I Knew, 1925. (autobiography)
 Langtry, Emilie Charlotte. The life of Mrs. Langtry, the Jersey Lily, and queen of the stage, 1882. Pinder & Howes Leeds
 Langtry, Lillie. All at Sea (novel) 1909.

See also
 Academy of Music/Riviera Theatre
 English royal mistress

References

External links

 Lillie Langtry Museum on the Internet
 Lillie Langtry biography
 
 
 History of East Cliff
 Article on Professional Beauties of the Victorian era

1853 births
1929 deaths
19th-century British actresses
20th-century British actresses
Mistresses of Edward VII
Women of the Victorian era
British emigrants to the United States
British people of Norman descent
British racehorse owners and breeders
British stage actresses
Vaudeville performers
Jersey women
Jersey Anglicans
American racehorse owners and breeders
American stage actresses
People from Saint Saviour, Jersey
People with acquired American citizenship
Deaths from pneumonia in Monaco
Expatriates in Monaco
Wives of baronets